Elluz Coromoto Peraza González (born January 26, 1958 in Caracas, Venezuela) is a Venezuelan pageant titleholder and actress. Peraza was Miss Venezuela 1976, but she resigned on May 24, 1976, because she married two days after her coronation. First runner-up Judith Castillo of Nueva Esparta succeeded her. Now successfully working as a writer, producer and director at a Christian company, "yesHEis" doing short films to share through the internet. You can see her in some of those short films going to: es.yesheis.com

Personal life 
She was Miss Venezuela 1976, but only by 36 hours (she rejected her crown for marriage)
She was married to Jorge Martínez (2001–2002) (divorced), German Freites (1982–1984) (widowed) 1 child, and
Nehomar Bruzual (1976–1980) (divorced) 1 child. One grand daughter and one grandson. 2011 her first and 2014 the second.

TV-Novelas
Rafaela (1977)
Catatumbo (1980)
María del Mar (1978)
Emilia (telenovela) (1980)
La Fruta Amarga (1981)
Cenicienta (1981)
El Pecado de una Madre (1982)
Una Flor en el Fango
Sueño Contigo (1987)
Alba Marina (1988)
La Sombra de Piera (1989)
Pasionaria (1990)
Mundo de Fieras (1991)
Peligrosa (1994)
Como tú, ninguna (1995)
El Perdon de los Pecados (1996)
Quirpa de Tres Mujeres (1996)
La Mujer del Presidente (1997) Colombia
El Amor es Mas Fuerte (1998) Colombia
Carita Pintada (1999)
Vuelve Junto a Mi (2000)
Secreto de Amor (2001)
Lejana como el viento (2002)
Rebeca (2003)
Anita, No Te Rajes (2004)
 Tierra de Pasiones (2006)
Bajo las Riendas del Amor (2007)
El Rostro de Analía (2008)
Cuento Sin Hadas (2009)FILM
Perro Amor (2009)
El Fantasma de Elena (2010)
Mi Corazón Insiste… en Lola Volcán (2011)
El Laberinto (2012) 
Marido En Alquiler (2013)

References

External links
Telemundo Website
 Official "El Rostro de Analía" Website
Miss Venezuela Official Website

1958 births
Living people
People from Caracas
Venezuelan telenovela actresses
Miss Venezuela winners
Venezuelan expatriates in the United States